Champsecret is a commune in the Orne department in north-western France.

Points of interest
Arboretum de l'Étoile des Andaines

See also
Communes of the Orne department
Parc naturel régional Normandie-Maine

References

Communes of Orne
Orne communes articles needing translation from French Wikipedia